Phineus is a Greek mythological king of Thrace, visited by Jason and the Argonauts.

Phineus may also refer to:
 Phineus (son of Belus), turned to stone by Perseus
 Phineus, one of the sons of Lycaon, king of Arcadia
 Phineus (insect) a genus of shield bugs in the subfamily Discocephalinae

See also
Phineus (mythology)
Phineas (disambiguation)
Phinehas (disambiguation)